Desmond Governey (11 September 1920 – 29 December 1984) was an Irish Fine Gael politician who served as a Teachta Dála (TD) for the Carlow–Kilkenny constituency from 1961 to 1977 and 1981 to 1982. He served as a Senator for the Industrial and Commercial Panel from 1977 to 1981.

He was elected to Dáil Éireann as a Fine Gael TD for the Carlow–Kilkenny constituency at the 1961 general election. He was re-elected at each subsequent general election until his defeat at the 1977 general election. Following the loss of his Dáil seat, Governey was elected to the 14th Seanad as a Senator for the Industrial and Commercial Panel, where he served from 1977 to 1981. He regained his Dáil seat at the 1981 general election, and was re-elected at the February 1982 general election, before retiring from politics at the November 1982 general election.

He was educated at Castleknock College and was in government under his former school mate Liam Cosgrave.

References

1920 births
1984 deaths
Fine Gael TDs
Members of the 17th Dáil
Members of the 18th Dáil
Members of the 19th Dáil
Members of the 20th Dáil
Members of the 14th Seanad
Members of the 22nd Dáil
Members of the 23rd Dáil
People educated at Castleknock College
Fine Gael senators